Jonathan Coggan  (born 25 April 1983) is a British paralympic wheelchair rugby player. He won a gold medal for the Great Britain national wheelchair rugby team at the 2020 Summer Paralympics in the mixed event. Coggan was appointed Member of the Order of the British Empire (MBE) in the 2022 New Year Honours for services to wheelchair rugby.

Early life and education 

Coggan was born in South Woodham Ferrers, Essex, and attended the local William de Ferrers School.  He continued his education studying Public Services at Southend College for Further Education.

Injury and Recovery 
As a 16-year-old In April 2000 on the way to college, Coggan was involved in a car crash that left him with a broken neck.  He was hospitalised for nearly twelve months at Stoke Mandeville Hospital, and as part of his rehabilitation was introduced to Wheelchair Rugby.

Wheelchair Rugby Career 
Coggan started playing club rugby in 2001, and in 2002 was invited on a World Rugby Tour with the GB development squad. The tour took in San Diego, Sydney, Singapore and Cape Town. In 2003 he participated in the World Wheelchair Games in Christchurch, New Zealand, and then went on to gain his first full international cap playing in the 2004 Paralympics in Athens.
Since then, Coggan has been a constant fixture in the GB squad and is a veteran of five Paralympic Games. Considered to be one of the best 0.5s in the game, he has won best in class at the 2006 World Championships and in the 2009 and 2011 European Championships. 
Now one of the squad’s most senior members, Coggan is a role model to many of his team mates both on and off the court continuing to be an integral part of the squad.

2020 Tokyo Paralympic Games: Gold

2016 Rio Paralympic Games – 5th

2012 London Paralympics – 5th

2008 Beijing Paralympic Games – 4th

2004 Athens Paralympic Games – 4th

2019 European Championships, Denmark – 1st

2015 European Championships, Finland – 1st

2014 World Championships, Denmark – 5th

2013 European Championships – 3rd

2011 European Championships, Switzerland – 2nd

2007 European Championships, Finland – 1st

2005 European Championships, Denmark – 1st

References 

1983 births
Living people
Sportspeople from Hertfordshire
Paralympic wheelchair rugby players of Great Britain
Paralympic gold medalists for Great Britain
British wheelchair rugby players
Wheelchair rugby players at the 2020 Summer Paralympics
Medalists at the 2020 Summer Paralympics
Paralympic medalists in wheelchair rugby
Members of the Order of the British Empire